This is a  list of lakes and reservoirs in the U.S. state of Illinois. The lakes are ordered by their unique names, (i.e. Lake Smith or Smith Lake would both be listed under "S").

A
 Anderson Lake, Fulton County
 Antioch Lake, Antioch, Lake County. 
 Apple Canyon Lake (reservoir), a private lake resort community near Apple River in Jo Daviess County. 
 Argyle Lake (reservoir), McDonough County
 Lake Arlington, Arlington Heights, Cook County. 
 Augusta Lake (reservoir), Hancock County.

B
 Baldwin Lake (reservoir), Randolph County
 Bangs Lake, Wauconda, Lake County
 Lake Barrington, Lake County
 Bayles Lake (reservoir), Iroquois County
 Big Bear Lake, Vernon Hills, Lake County. 
 Lake Bloomington (reservoir), McLean County. 
 Bluff Lake, Lake County. 
 Lake Bracken (reservoir), Galesburg, Knox County. 
 Butler Lake (reservoir), Libertyville, Lake County.

C
 Lake Calumet, Chicago, Cook County
 Candlewick Lake (reservoir), Boone County. 
 Canton Lake (reservoir), Fulton County
 Lake Carlton (reservoir), Whiteside County
 Carlyle Lake (reservoir), Clinton County
 Lake Carroll (reservoir), Carroll County
 Lake Catherine, Lake County. 
 Cedar Lake (reservoir), Jackson County
 Cedar Lake, Lake Villa, Lake County. 
 Lake Centralia (reservoir), Marion County. 
 Chain O'Lakes, Lake and McHenry Counties
 Channel Lake, Lake County
 Lake Charles (reservoir), Lake County
 Lake Charleston (reservoir), Coles County
 Clear Lake, Sangamon County
 Clinton Lake (reservoir), DeWitt County
 Coffeen Lake (reservoir), Montgomery County
 Countryside Lake (reservoir), Lake County. 
 Crab Orchard Lake (reservoir), Williamson County
 Cranberry Lake, Lake County. 
 Crystal Lake, McHenry County
Lake Charleston, coles county

D
 Davis Lake, Lake County. 
 Dawson Lake (reservoir), McLean County
 Lake Decatur (reservoir), Macon County
 Deep Lake, Lake County.  
 Deer Lake, Lake County.  
 Devils Kitchen Lake (reservoir), Williamson County
 Diamond Lake, near Mundelein, Lake County. 
 Druce Lake, Lake County.  
 Duck Lake, Lake County. 
 Dunlap Lake (reservoir), Madison County.

E
 East Fork Lake (reservoir), Richland County.
 Echo Lake, Lake Zurich, Lake County. 
 Lake of Egypt (reservoir), Williamson and Johnson Counties
 Elmwood Farms Lake (reservoir), Lake County. 
 Evergreen Lake (reservoir), McLean and Woodford Counties.

F
 Lake Fairfield, Lake County. 
 Fish Lake, Lake County, previously known as Duncan Lake. 
 Five Oaks Ski Lake, Frankfort, Will County
 Forest Lake, Lake County
 Fourth Lake, Lake Villa, Lake County. 
 Fox Lake, Lake County
 Frentress Lake, Jo Daviess County
 Fyre Lake (reservoir), near Sherrard, Mercer County.

G
 Gages Lake, Lake County
 Lake Galena (reservoir), Jo Daviess County
 Lake Glenn Shoals (reservoir), Montgomery County
 Goose Lake, Grundy County
 Governor Bond Lake (reservoir), Bond County
 Grass Lake, Lake County. 
 Grassy Lake, Lake County. 
 Grays Lake, Lake County
 Griswold Lake, McHenry County.

H
 Hastings Lake, Lake County. 
 Heidecke Lake, Grundy County
 Hendrick Lake, Lake County. 
 Hifer Lake, McLean County. 
 Highland Lake, Lake County. 
 Lake Hillcrest (reservoir), Madison County
 Lake Holiday (reservoir), LaSalle County
 Homer White Lake (reservoir), Lake County. 
 Honey Lake, Lake County. 
 Horseshoe Lake, Alexander County
 Horseshoe Lake, Madison County

I
 Lake Iroquois (reservoir), Iroquois County
 Island Lake, Lake and McHenry Counties

J
 Lake Jacksonville (reservoir), near Jacksonville, Morgan County

K
 Kellart Lake (reservoir), near Cissna Park, Iroquois County. 
 Kidd Lake, Monroe County
 Lake Killarney, McHenry County
 Kinkaid Lake (reservoir), Jackson County

L
 Lake in the Hills
 Lake Lancelot, Peoria County
 LaSalle Lake State Fish and Wildlife Area
 Lake Le-Aqua-Na State Park
 Lincoln Lake near Coal City
 Lake Linden in Lindenhurst
 Lake Petersburg, Menard County
 Little Grassy Lake (reservoir), Jackson and Williamson Counties
 Little Swan Lake (reservoir), near Avon, Fulton County
 Loch Lomond, Mundelein, Lake County
 Long Lake
 Loon Lake (East and West), Lake County
 Lake Lou Yaeger, Montgomery County
 Lake Louise in Barrington
 Lake Louise near Bryon

M
 Lake Marie, Lake County
 Lake Mattoon (reservoir), Coles, Cumberland and Shelby Counties
 McCullom Lake
 Lake Meadow, Madison County
 Meredosia Lake
 Mermet Lake State Fish and Wildlife Area
 Lake Michigan 
 Mill Creek Lake, Clark County
 Miltmore Lake, Lake County
 Monee Reservoir, Will County
 Mud Lake (disambiguation)
 Murphy Lake (reservoir), Cook County
 Lake Murphysboro State Park (reservoir), Jackson County

N
 Newton Lake State Fish and Wildlife Area (reservoir), Jasper County
 Lake Napa Suwe, Wauconda
 Nippersink Lake, Lake County

O
 Lake Opeka, Des Plaines, Cook County
 Otter Lake (reservoir), Macoupin County

P–Q
Papoose Lake, Cook County 
 Lake Paradise (reservoir), Coles County
 Peoria Lake, Peoria and Tazewell Counties
 Petite Lake, Lake County
 Pierce Lake, a man-made lake in Rock Cut State Park
 Pistakee Lake
 Potomac Lake, Lake County
 Pana Lake, a man made lake Christian and Shelby Counties
 Paragon Lake, also a man made lake in Christian County

R
 Raccoon Lake, Marion County
 Ramsey Lake (reservoir), Fayette County
 Redwing Slough Lake, Lake County
 Rend Lake (reservoir), Franklin and Jefferson Counties
 Rice Lake, Fulton County
 Round Lake, Lake County

S
 Saganashkee Slough, Cook County 
 Saint Marys Lake near Mundelein, Lake County
 Sam Dale Lake (reservoir), Wayne County
 Sand Lake, Lake County
 Sangchris Lake (reservoir), Christian and Sangamon Counties
 Lake Sara near Effingham
 Senachwine Lake
 Shabbona Lake (reservoir), DeKalb County
 Shagbark Lake Near Des Plaines River, Illinois
 Lake Shelbyville (reservoir), Shelby and Moultrie Counties
 Silver Lake, Lake County
 Skokie Lagoons (reservoir), Cook County
 Slough Lake, Lake County
 Spoon Lake near Dahinda
 Spring Lake State Fish and Wildlife Area
 Lake Springfield (reservoir), Sangamon County 
 Sterling Lake, Lake County
 Lake Storey, Galesburg, Illinois
 Lake Summerset (reservoir), Stephenson and Winnebago Counties
 Sun Lake, Lake County
 Sylvan Lake, Lake County

T
 Lake Taylorville (reservoir), Christian County
 Third Lake
 Lake Thunderbird (reservoir), Putnam County 
 Tower Lakes
 Timberlake, Barrington, Lake County, Illinois

U
 Upper Peoria Lake

V
 Valley Lake (Illinois), Lake County. 
 Vandalia Lake (reservoir), Fayette County. 
 Lake Vermilion (reservoir), Vermilion County
 Vermont New Lake (reservoir), McDonough County.

W–Y
 Washington County State Lake
 Waterford Lake near Lake Villa
 Waverly Lake. Morgan County
 West Frankfort Lake, Franklin County
 Lake Wildwood (reservoir), Marshall County near Varna. 
 Wolf Lake, Cook County
 Wonder Lake, McHenry County
 Woodhaven Lakes, Lee County
 Wooster Lake, Lake County

Z
 Lake Zurich, Lake County

Former lakes
 Ferne Clyffe Lake, Johnson County
 Lake Kanagga, Effingham County

See also

List of rivers of Illinois

References

Lakes

Illinois